The tertulia de Nava was a Spanish Enlightenment intellectual circle in San Cristóbal de la Laguna that regularly met at . From its creation by Tomás de Nava-Grimón y Porlier to its heyday under his son , the union brought together grand personalities from Tenerife and the rest of the Canary Islands, such as Fernando de la Guerra y del Hoyo-Solórzano, Fernando de Molina y Quesada, Lope Antonio de la Guerra y Peña, Juan Antonio de Urtusáustegui, José de Llarena y Mesa, Agustín de Betancourt, and others. José de Viera y Clavijo was the major promoter and architect of the tertulia as he was integral to the  during the 18th century.

References

San Cristóbal de La Laguna
Canarian culture
Age of Enlightenment